Titley Pool is a lake in Herefordshire, England. It is a naturally formed kettle lake which was enlarged into a reservoir by the construction of an earth embankment dam at its eastern end during the 18th century as part of the landscaping of the grounds of Eywood House Estate.

The lake is one of the largest bodies of open water in the county of Herefordshire and an important wetland ornithological site.

External links
Herefordshire Nature Trust - Titley Pool

Reservoirs in Herefordshire
Kettle lakes in the United Kingdom